Madame Spy is a 1934 American adventure film directed by Karl Freund and starring Fay Wray, Oscar Apfel, Edward Arnold and Nils Asther. The film was produced and distributed by Universal Pictures. It is a remake of the 1932 film Under False Flag which was produced by Deutsche Universal, the German subsidiary of the studio, and was itself based on a novel of the same title by Max W. Kimmich.

Synopsis
Maria is married to Captain Franck of German Intelligence. He does not know she is a Russian assigned to spy on him. When he is told to uncover a leak, he vows revenge on his wife.

Cast
Fay Wray as Marie Franck 
Oscar Apfel as Pahlke
Edward Arnold as Schultz
Nils Asther as Capt. Franck
Vince Barnett as Peter
Noah Beery, Sr. as Gen. Philipow
A.S. 'Pop' Byron as Chemist
Eddy Chandler as Austrian Officer
Stephen Chase as Petroskie
Robert Ellis as Sulkin
Ruth Fallows as Lulu
Henry Gerbil as Austrian aviator
Robert Graves as Detective
Herbert Holcombe as Orderly
Jerry Jerome as Russian aviator
Rollo Lloyd as Baum 
Adrienne Marden as Woman 
John Miljan as Weber
Philip Morris as Russian officer
Reinhold Pasch as Dumb guy
Edward Peil, Sr. as Garage owner
Werner Plack as Conductor
Ferdinand Schumann-Heink as Cafe owner
Albert J. Smith as Lackey
David Torrence as Seerfeldt
Anders Van Haden as Detective
Douglas Walton as Karl
Arthur Wanzer as Chemist

See also
Under False Flag (1932)

References

Bibliography
 Goble, Alan. The Complete Index to Literary Sources in Film. Walter de Gruyter, 1999.

External links 
 

1934 films
1930s spy films
American spy films
Universal Pictures films
Films directed by Karl Freund
World War I spy films
Films set in Germany
Films set in Russia
American remakes of German films
American black-and-white films
American adventure films
1934 adventure films
1930s English-language films
1930s American films
Films based on German novels